Win Ben Stein's Money is an American television game show created by Al Burton and Donnie Brainard that aired first-run episodes from July 28, 1997 to January 31, 2003, on Comedy Central. The show featured three contestants who competed to answer general knowledge questions in order to win the grand prize of $5,000 from the show's host, Ben Stein. In the second half of each episode, Stein participated as a "common" contestant in order to defend his money from being taken by his competitors. The show won six Daytime Emmy awards, with Stein and Jimmy Kimmel, the show's original co-host, sharing the Outstanding Game Show Host award in 1999. The show was produced by Valleycrest Productions, Ltd. and distributed by Buena Vista Television, both subsidiaries of The Walt Disney Company.

As noted in the disclaimer during the closing credits, prize money won by contestants was paid from a prize budget furnished by the producers of the show. Any money left over in that budget at the end of a season was given to Stein. If the total amount paid out during a season exceeded that budget, the production company paid the excess. In this way, Stein was never in any danger of losing money from his own pocket.

Stein's co-host was Jimmy Kimmel for the first three years. Kimmel left in 2000 and was replaced by Nancy Pimental, who co-hosted the program through 2001. Kimmel's cousin Sal Iacono took over the role in 2002 until the series' end. Kimmel made guest appearances and hosted College Week in 2001.

Game format

Round 1
The game began with three contestants and $5,000 in Stein's bank. Five categories were always available for contestants to choose from, with pun-laden titles hinting at the questions' content. After a contestant chose a category, its value was revealed ($50, $100, or $150) and Stein asked a toss-up question open to all three contestants. Higher-valued categories were more difficult. If a contestant rang in and answered correctly, the question value was added to their score and deducted from Stein's bank. An incorrect response carried no penalty, but allowed the other two contestants a chance to ring in. The contestant who answered the toss-up was then asked a follow-up question worth $50. If they could not answer, either of the other two could ring in and attempt to score. If no one rang in and answered the toss-up question correctly, the $50 follow-up question was asked as a toss-up as well. Once both questions had been asked, the category was removed from play and a new one substituted in its place, and the contestant who gave the last correct answer to that point chose the next category.

The co-host would warn the contestants when there were two minutes left in the round. Once time ran out, the lowest-scoring contestant was eliminated and their total was returned to Stein's bank. If there was a tie for low score, one last toss-up was asked; an incorrect response allowed the opponent to advance by default.

As a running gag, Stein often poked fun at rival quiz show Jeopardy!, given the similarities of formats between both shows. As such, any contestant who accidentally responded in the form of a question was made to wear a dunce cap for the rest of the round.

Round 2
Stein now replaced the eliminated contestant and turned over question-asking duties to the co-host, who always stated that Stein had no advance knowledge of any questions that would be used from that point forward. This round was played similarly to the first, with some rule changes. Stein chose the first category to start the round, and the values were increased to $200–$500, in increments of $100. Each category consisted of a single toss-up question, with no follow-up. If Stein answered correctly, his bank total remained unchanged; his podium (which was always on the far right) always displayed a dollar sign instead of his total. The co-host announced a one-minute warning before the round ended. When time ran out, the lower-scoring contestant was eliminated, forfeiting all money won, which again was returned to Stein's bank; in the event of a tie, a toss-up tiebreaker was asked, with Stein not participating. The higher-scoring contestant kept all money won and advanced to the bonus round for a chance to win the entire $5,000.

Bonus Round: Best of 10 Test of Knowledge
In the bonus round, the Best of 10 Test of Knowledge, both Stein and the winner of the second round were placed in isolation booths so that neither could hear the other's answers. The contestant had the choice of playing first or second. The person playing first was given 60 seconds to answer a total of 10 questions, and could pass if he or she chose to do so; however, questions which were passed or answered incorrectly could not be returned to during the round. After the first person played the round, the answers to the missed or passed questions were reviewed, and the other was given 60 seconds to answer the same 10 questions.

If the contestant answered more questions correctly than Stein, the contestant won the entire $5,000 grand prize that Stein had put into the bank at the beginning of the show. If Stein answered more questions correctly, the contestant kept only the money won in the first two rounds. If the round ended in a tie, the contestant won an additional $1,000; however, in the earliest episodes of the first season, the contestant won the full $5,000 jackpot in the event of a tie.

The isolation booth for the contestant was plain, with a hardwood stool and a bare hanging light bulb. From season 3 to the end of the series, the contestant's booth had a large crack running down the wall. Stein's booth was more luxurious, with a leather wing-back chair and other lavish furnishings.

"Ben Stein's Cup" episodes
Near the end of the fourth season, six of the best contestants who previously won $5,000 returned for a special "Ben Stein's Cup" episode, for a chance to win $25,000. In the first round, question values were $200, $400, and $600, with follow-up questions worth $200. In the second round, questions were worth $800–$2,000 in increments of $400. In both episodes, the winners attempted to defeat Stein for the entire $25,000. The first "Ben Stein's Cup" was co-hosted by Jimmy Kimmel, with the second co-hosted by Nancy Pimental.

Music
Various pieces of classical music were used as the themes. The opening theme was the fourth movement of Beethoven's Ninth Symphony, Ode to Joy, which was repeated to begin the second round, and again if the champion won the $5,000. The closing theme was Ride of the Valkyries, from Richard Wagner's The Valkyrie. Other classical music pieces used on the show included:
 Wachet auf, ruft uns die Stimme by Johann Sebastian Bach (at the beginning of the show when Stein introduces himself)
 Water Music by Georg Friedrich Händel (leading to first commercial break)
 Spring from The Four Seasons by Antonio Vivaldi (Coming out of the first commercial break)
 Eine kleine Nachtmusik by Wolfgang Amadeus Mozart (leading into the second commercial break)
 Trepak (a/k/a "The Russian Dance") from The Nutcracker by Pyotr Ilyich Tchaikovsky (used to segue to the final commercial break)
 Night on Bald Mountain by Modest Mussorgsky (coming out of the final commercial break and cuing to the final round)

International versions

United Kingdom
Win Beadle's Money was hosted by Jeremy Beadle and Richard Morton. It aired on Channel 5 from August 2 to December 22, 1999, and was produced by Grundy.

Australia
Win Roy & H.G.'s Money, hosted by "Rampaging" Roy Slaven (John Doyle) and H.G. Nelson (Greig Pickhaver), aired on Seven Network for eight episodes in 2000.

Hungary
Hoztam egy milliót!, hosted by Tamás Vitray with Nóra Kovács, aired on Magyar Televízió in 2003. The grand prize was 1 000 000 HUF.

References

External links

 Win Ben Stein's Money at Comedy Central.com
 Win Ben Stein's Money at Futility.com
 

1990s American comedy game shows
1997 American television series debuts
2000s American comedy game shows
2003 American television series endings
Comedy Central game shows
Comedy Central original programming
Daytime Emmy Award for Outstanding Game Show winners
English-language television shows
Television series by Disney–ABC Domestic Television